State Highway 213 (SH 213) is a short state highway running from near Lipscomb to Higgins in the eastern Texas Panhandle.  The route was conditionally designated along its current route on September 11, 1934, but had yet to be constructed by 1938. On September 1, 1988, the section concurrent with SH 305 to Spur 188 was cancelled.

Junction list

References

213
Transportation in Lipscomb County, Texas